Dyagilevo is a rural locality (a village) in Moseyevskoye Rural Settlement, Totemsky  District, Vologda Oblast, Russia. The population was 4 as of 2002.

Geography 
Dyagilevo is located 32 km northwest of Totma (the district's administrative centre) by road. Moseyevo is the nearest rural locality.

References 

Rural localities in Totemsky District